The Pyongyang Metro Chŏllima Line is a rapid transit line owned and operated by Pyongyang Metro in Pyongyang, North Korea. 

The line has a depot at Sopo, near the Korean State Railway's Sopo station.

Allegedly, in the 1980s there was a plan to extend the line to Pyongsong.

The section from Ponghwa station to Puhung station is also referred to as the Mangyongdae Line; nonetheless most sources refer to the metro system as having two lines. There are plans to extend the line from Puhung to Mangyongdae and from Pulgunbyol to Sopo, which already connects to the metro depot, but does not have third rail electrification.

In a 1999 South Korean news broadcast, it stated that the third line was already under construction and scheduled to open for the 55th Party Foundation Day in 2000. It was to run from Kwangbok station to Mangyongdae.

Stations

Chŏllima Line

References

Chollima Line
Railway lines opened in 1973
1973 establishments in North Korea